Genocide Remembrance Day  may refer to:
 Armenian Genocide Remembrance Day (24 April)
 Bengali Genocide Remembrance Day (25 March)
International Holocaust Remembrance Day (27 January)
Yom HaShoah (April or May)
 Cambodian Genocide Remembrance Day (20 May)
 International Day of Reflection on the 1994 Rwanda Genocide (7 April)
 Tamil Genocide Remembrance Day (18 May) (Mullivaikkal Remembrance Day)
 Kwibuka, marking the start of the annual official mourning period for the victims of the Rwandan genocide (7 April)
 Pontian Greek Genocide Remembrance Day (May 19)
 United Nations International Day of Commemoration and Dignity of the Victims of the Crime of Genocide and of the Prevention of this Crime (9 December)
Holodomor Memorial Day (4th Saturday of November)

See also 
 European Day of Remembrance for Victims of Stalinism and Nazism
 Holocaust Memorial Days
 Mullivaikkal Remembrance Day, a day of remembrance which is observed by Sri Lankan Tamils in commemoration of the victims who died during the final stages of the Sri Lankan Civil War